Riley Edward Ingram (born October 1, 1941) is an American politician. From 1992-2020 he served in the Virginia House of Delegates, representing the 62nd district east of Richmond, made up of parts of Chesterfield, Henrico and Prince George Counties and the city of Hopewell. He is a member of the Republican Party.

Positions and appointments
Ingram was co-chair of the House committee on Counties, Cities and Towns 1998–2001 having been appointed in 2002.

He served on the committees on:
Appropriations (1998–)
Counties, Cities and Towns (1992–)
General Laws (1998–2001)
Militia and Police (2000–2001)
Mining and Mineral Resources (1992–1999)
Privileges and Elections (1992–)

Electoral history
Ingram was elected to the Hopewell city council in 1986, and became mayor in 1988.

In 1989, he challenged 28-year Democratic incumbent Charles Hardaway Marks in the 64th House district, but lost. He was re-elected to the Hopewell city council in 1990.

In the 1991 redistricting, the 62nd House district was moved northwards to include Hopewell. Ingram defeated another Democratic incumbent, R. Beasley Jones, for the House seat.

Riley retired and did not file for the 2019 election.

Notes

External links
 (campaign finance)

1941 births
Living people
Republican Party members of the Virginia House of Delegates
American members of the Church of the Nazarene
People from Hopewell, Virginia
People from Halifax County, Virginia
21st-century American politicians